Salomon is a masculine given name. Bearers include:

 Salomon of Cornwall, a fifth century warrior prince
 Salomon, King of Brittany (died 874)
 Salomon II (died after 1809), Emperor of Ethiopia from 1777 to 1779
 Salomon Gessner (1730–1788), Swiss painter, graphic artist, government official, newspaper publisher and poet
 Salomon Heine (1767–1844), Hanoverian merchant and banker in Hamburg
 Salomon Kalou (born 1985), Ivorian footballer
 Salomon Koninck (1609–1656), Dutch painter and engraver
 Salomón Libman (born 1984), Peruvian footballer
 Salomon Maimon (1753–1800), Lithuanian Jewish philosopher
 Salomon Mesdach (c. 1600–1632), Dutch painter
 Salomon Morel (1919–2007), Polish Jewish officer and commander of communist concentration camps, accused of war crimes and crimes against humanity
 Salomón Nazar (born 1953), Honduran retired football goalkeeper
 Salomon Olembé (born 1980), Cameroonian former footballer
 Salomon Oppenheim (1772–1828), German Jewish banker
 Salomón Rondón (born 1989), Venezuelan footballer
 Salomon Mayer von Rothschild (1774–1855), German-born banker in the Austrian Empire, son of Mayer Amschel Rothschild
 Salomon van Ruysdael (c. 1602–1670), Dutch landscape painter
 Salomon Smolianoff (1899–1976), Russian Jewish counterfeiter and Holocaust survivor

Masculine given names